Bug is a solo album by Dave Davies (best known as lead guitarist and co-founder of British rock band The Kinks), released in May 2002. It was his fourth true solo studio album, almost 20 years after the release of his third effort Chosen People.

Track listing
All tracks composed by Dave Davies.

 "Whose Foolin' Who"
 "It Ain't Over, 'Till It's Done!"
 "Lie! .........."
 "Let Me Be"
 "Displaced Person"
 "Rock You, Rock Me"
 "Flowers in the Rain"
 "Fortis Green"
 "Why?!!"
 "True Phenomenon"
 "Bug........"
 "De-Bug"
 "Life After Life (Transformation)"

Personnel
Dave Davies – guitar, vocals
Bryan Myers – percussion
David Nolte – bass
Kristian Hoffman – piano
Jim Laspesa – bass, drums, vocals

References

2002 albums
Dave Davies albums
E1 Music albums